Cannonball Adderley's Fiddler on the Roof is an album by jazz saxophonist Cannonball Adderley released on the Capitol label featuring performances of material from the Broadway musical Fiddler on the Roof by Adderley with Nat Adderley, Charles Lloyd, Joe Zawinul, Sam Jones and Louis Hayes.

Reception

The Allmusic review by Scott Yanow and Tim Sendra awarded the album 4 stars and states "Cannonball plays near his peak; this is certainly the finest album by this particular sextet". The Penguin Guide to Jazz described the album as "not revelatory but very entertaining".

Track listing 
All compositions by Jerry Bock & Sheldon Harnick except as indicated
 "Fiddler on the Roof" - 7:22  
 "To Life" - 5:06  
 "Sabbath Prayer" - 3:19  
 "Chavalah" - 2:56  
 "Sewing Machine" - 3:34  
 "Now I Have Everything" - 4:10  
 "Do You Love Me?" - 5:02  
 "Matchmaker, Matchmaker" - 5:33  
 "Sweet Georgia Bright" (Charles Lloyd) - 5:36 Bonus track on CD reissue  
 "Island Blues" (Lloyd) - 2:24 Bonus track on CD reissue  
 "Little Boy With the Sad Eyes" (Julian "Cannonball" Adderley) - 2:26 Bonus track on CD reissue  
 "Goodbye Charlie" (Dory Langdon, André Previn) - 2:55  
 Recorded in New York City, NY on September 8 (tracks 9-12) and October 19 & 21 (all other tracks), 1964
 The spelling of track four for the play is "Chavaleh".

Personnel 
 Cannonball Adderley - alto saxophone
 Nat Adderley - cornet
 Charles Lloyd - tenor saxophone, flute
 Joe Zawinul - piano
 Sam Jones - bass
 Louis Hayes - drums

References 

1964 albums
Capitol Records albums
Cannonball Adderley albums
Albums produced by David Axelrod (musician)